The Ski Club of Australia is a private club and ski lodge located in Thredbo, New South Wales, Australia. It was founded in 1920 and as its foundation pre-dated the foundation of the Ski Council of New South Wales in 1929, it played a pivotal role in the history of skiing and ski racing in Australia. Four members of the Ski Club, Herbert Schlink, Eric Fisher, William Gordon and John Laidley, made the first winter crossing of the Snowy Mountains Main Range from Kiandra to Kosciusko in 1927. Slalom skiing was introduced into Australia by the club. The club formerly had an official role in Australian skiing and its 75th Anniversary history was written by Olympian Bob Arnott.

Notable members
 1956 and 1960 Olympian and pilot Christine Davy
 1952 Olympian and company director Bob Arnott
 Gardener Beatrice Bligh
 Engineer, businessman and benefactor Andrew Thyne Reid
 Gynaecologist and hospital administrator Sir Herbert Schlink
 Solicitor and company director Sir Alastair Stephen

Website
The club website is only accessible to members.

References

1920 establishments in Australia
Sports organizations established in 1920
Organisations based in New South Wales
Skiing in Australia
Ski clubs
Sporting clubs in New South Wales